Freddie, Fred or Frederick West may refer to:

Politicians
Frederick West (1767–1852), British MP for Denbigh, younger son of John West, 2nd Earl De La Warr
Frederick Richard West (1799–1862), his son, British MP for Denbigh and East Grinstead, father of William Cornwallis-West

Sportspeople
Fred West (footballer, born 1905) (1905–1953), Australian footballer for Hawthorn
Fred West (footballer, born 1929) (1929–2011), Australian footballer for Collingwood
Fred West (basketball) (born c.1969), American power forward

Others
Frederick T. West (1893–1989), American orthodontist
Freddie West (1896–1988), English aviator and recipient of First World War Victoria Cross
Fred West (1941–1995), English serial killer